Marc Molitor (born 21 September 1948 in Strasbourg) is a French former professional football (soccer) player.

External links
Profile
Profile

1948 births
Living people
French footballers
France international footballers
RC Strasbourg Alsace players
OGC Nice players
Ligue 1 players
Ligue 2 players
Footballers from Strasbourg
Association football forwards